The Batu Gajah Hospital (HBG) is a public hospital in Batu Gajah, Kinta District, Perak, Malaysia.

History
The hospital was constructed in 1880 by the British Malaya government. In 1941, the hospital was taken over by the Japanese government. In 1946, the hospital opened its X-ray department. In 1956, a nursing training center was opened at the hospital. In 1976, the hospital lost its general hospital status over Ipoh Hospital.

Architecture
The hospital on top of a 55-hectare of land.

See also
 List of hospitals in Malaysia
 Healthcare in Malaysia

References

External links

 

1880 establishments in British Malaya
Hospitals established in 1880
Hospitals in Perak
Kinta District